The concept of Shatsthala (ಷಟ್ಸ್ತಲ or ಷಟ್ ಸ್ಥಲ in Kannada, षट्स्थल in Sanskrit language; ṣaṭ-sthala) or Six (Ṣaṭ/ಷಟ್) Phases/Stages (Sthala/ಸ್ಥಲ) is pivotal to the veerashaiva tradition. Shatsthala is a conflation of Shat and Sthala which means 'six phases/states/levels' through which a person (a bhakta/seeker) advances in one's ultimate quest of realisation of the Supreme, or, simply put, enlightenment. (The word enlightenment used here refers to the Indian notion of enlightenment.) The Shatsthala comprises the Bhakta Sthala, Maheshwara Sthala, Prasadi Sthala, Pranalingi Sthala, Sharana Sthala and the Aikya Sthala. The Aikya Sthala is the culmination where the soul leaves the physical body and merges with the Supreme.

While the origins of the Shatsthala may be traced to the Agamas, particularly the Parameshwaratantra, with the evolution of Veerashaivism Shatsthala seems to have received more attention.

While Basava understood Shatsthala as a process with various stages to be attained in succession, the credit of refuting this and redefining Shatsthala goes to Channabasavanna, Basava's nephew. Channabasavanna differed radically from his uncle and held that a soul can reach its salvation in any stage.

Brief Description of the Sthalas
A brief description of the six sthala-s, according to the Veerashaiva Lingayat tradition. The 8th century work Siddhanta Shikhamani provides a detailed description of the shatshtala and what a bhakta should do in each of the sthala. It divides each of the six Sthalas further into several 'avaantara' or 'antara' ('ಅವಾಂತರ'/'ಅಂತರ' in Kannada) sthalas, which he calls 'Linga sthala' embedded or included in ("अन्तर्गत" in) each sthala. See for instance the opening lines of Chapter 17. 'Antara' means 'intermediate'. The list below contains both the sthalas and the associated antara/intermediate sthalas.

Chapter 1 to 14 of the Siddhanta Shikhamani, an eighth century Sanskrit text, lists and describes 44 antara sthalas of the main shatsthalas. From chapter 15 onwards, the text gives a further list and descriptions of 57 antara sthalas related to the main sthalas. Thus, it describes a total of 101 sthalas. As a 16th century Kannada commentator on the text describes in his Suprabhodini Teeku, these second set of 57 antara sthalas  pertain to someone who has already reached the aikya sthala and has become one with linga (lingaikya), the ultimate stage in the shatsthala.

1. Bhakta: Bhaktasthala involves the worship of Guru, Linga and Jangama . When one understands the true meaning of this Sthala, one conceives the true meaning of the trinity of Guru, Linga and Jangama . Through this Sthala one becomes free from the desires of the body and mind and becomes a Bhakta by virtue of his/her belief in Shiva.

 24 (15+9) antara sthala: Pinda stala, Pindajnana stala, Sansarheya sthala, Gurukaarunya sthala, Ligadhaarana sthala, Bhasmadhaarana sthala, Rudrakshadharana sthala, Panchakshara sthala, Bhaktamargakriya sthala, Ubhaya sthala, Trividhasampatti sthala, Prasadasveekara sthala / Chaturvidhasaaraya sthala, Three daana (daanatryaya) sthalas (namely, Sopaadidaana, Nirupaadidana and Sahajadana stala).
 And deekshaguru sthala, Shikshaguru stala, Jnanaguru stala,	Kriya Linga stala, Bhaava Linga stala,	Jnana Linga stala, Sway stala, Chara stala, Para stala.

2. Mahesha: Maheshasthala involves the actual practice of the above concept, which enables to lose the desire for material wealth, not coveting and not longing for unrighteous sensual pleasures.

 18 (9+9) antara sthala: Maaheshwara Prashansha sthala, Linganishta sthala, Poorvashrayanirasana sthala, (Sarva)Adwaitanirasana sthala, Aahwananirasana sthala, Astamuortinirasana sthala, Sarvagatva nirasana sthala, Shivajaganmaya stala, Shivabhakta or Bhaktadehikalinga stala.
 Kriyaagama stala, Bhaaragama stala,	Jnanagama stala,	Jakaaya stala, Akaaya stala,	Parakaaya stala,	Dharmachaara stala, Bhaavachana stala, Inanachara stala.

3. Prasadi: Prasaadisthala states that all things in this world are gifts of Shiva and whatever human receives as God’s gifts must be returned to him through the intermediacy of the Jangama, who represents Shiva.

 16 (7+9) antara sthala: Prasadi sthala, Gurumaahatmya sthala, Lingamahatmya sthala, Jangamamahatmya sthala, Bhaktamahatmya sthala, Sharanamahatmya sthala, Prasaadamahatmya sthala.
 Kaayanugraha stala,	Indriyaanugaha stala,	Praananugraha stala,	Kaayarpita stala, 	Karanaarpit stala,	Shistrya stala,	Shishya stala,	Shushrusha stala,	Sevya stala.

4. Pranalingi: Pranalingisthala makes one aware of the inner being. Here the seeker comes to believe that the Linga is the Jangama and all actions are transformed into prayers.

 14 (5+9) antara sthala: Pranalingi sthala, Pranalingaarchana sthala, Shivayoga samaadhi sthala, Linganija sthala, Anga linga sthala.
 Aatma stala,	Antaraatma stala,	Paramaatma stala,	Nirdehaagama stala,	Nirbhavaagama stala,	Nastaagama stala,	Aadiprasadi stala,	Antyaprasadi stala,	Sevyaprasadi stala.

5. Sharana: Sharanasthala endows an individual with the feeling and knowledge of God’s presence in his/her own soul and begins a direct dialogue with Shiva.

 16 (4+12) antara sthala: Sharana sthala, Taamasa nirasana sthala, Nirdesha sthala, Sheelasarnpadana sthala.
 Deeksha padodaka stala,	Shiksha padodaka stala,	Jnana padodaka stala,	Kriya Nishpatti stala,	Bhaava Nishpatti stala,	Jana Nishpatti stala,	Pindaakaasha stala, Bindwaakaasa stala,	Mahaakaasha stala,	Kriyaprakaasha stala,	Bhaavaprakaasha stala,	Jnanaprakaasha stala.

6. Aikya: Aikyasthala forms the final stage. A stage of the culmination of the sublime achievement. It is the unitary consciousness of Self and Shiva.

 13 (4+9) antara sthala: Aikya sthala, Aachara Sampatti sthala, Ekabhajana sthala, Sahabhojana sthala.
 Sweekruta Prasaadi stala,	Shistaradana stala,	Charaacharalaya stala,	Bhaanda stala,	Bhaajana stala,	Angaalepa stala,	Swaparaagna stala,	Bhaarabhaavala stala,	Jnanashoonya stala.

Notes

References

Lingayatism